Diamonds (Italian: Diamanti) is a 1939 Italian "white-telephones" comedy film directed by Corrado D'Errico and starring Doris Duranti, Lamberto Picasso and Laura Nucci.

It was made at Cinecittà Studios in Rome. The film's sets were designed by Salvo D'Angelo.

Cast
 Doris Duranti as Marta Aurasco
 Lamberto Picasso as Il marajah principe Mohammed 
 Laura Nucci as Anna
 Enrico Glori as Carlo Deremont
 Guglielmo Sinaz as Riccardo Krauss
 Gemma Bolognesi as Jeanne Deremont
 Romolo Costa as Il barone Kapperdorf 
 Alberto Manfredini as Morino, il direttore della tipografia
 Fausto Guerzoni as Sguerza, il capo tipografo 
 Olinto Cristina 
 Carlo Mariotti 
 Ori Monteverdi 
 Giuseppe Ricagno 
 Lia Rosa 
 Ernesto Torrini

References

Bibliography 
 Enrico Lancia. Dizionario del cinema italiano: Dal 1930 al 1944. Gremese Editore, 2005.

External links 
 

1939 comedy films
Italian comedy films
1939 films
1930s Italian-language films
Films based on works by Salvator Gotta
Films directed by Corrado D'Errico
Italian black-and-white films
Films shot at Cinecittà Studios
1930s Italian films